The New Zealand International Film Festival (NZIFF) (Māori: Whānau Mārama) is a film festival held annually across New Zealand throughout the latter half of the year, starting in Auckland in July.

The festival has grown significantly since the merger in 1984 of the Auckland International Film Festival (founded in 1969) and the Wellington Film Festival (founded 1972). The festival is operated by the New Zealand Film Festival Trust. In 2009, for the first time, the festival did away with its various regional names and united the various festivals under the banner of the New Zealand International Film Festival (using the abbreviation 'NZIFF'). Until then, each region had been promoted with the region’s name despite having shared a common programme and artwork since 2002. The festival has a long tradition of supporting New Zealand filmmakers and New Zealand cinema.

In 2021, though the Auckland edition was cancelled, it would continue in Wellington, Christchurch and other editions. Wellington is going to screen a total of 164 feature films from 51 countries, and Christchurch 95 features from 37 countries.

History
In 1996 the New Zealand Film Festival Trust was set up by Bill Sheat, the founding chairperson who remained in that role until 2003. The trust administers' annual film festivals in Auckland, Wellington and ten other centres with an annual attendance of over 250,000 (and a record in 2019 of over 264,000).

Auckland  
Auckland was the first city in the country to have a film festival. Founded in 1969 as a component of the Auckland Festival, the Auckland International Film Festival (AIFF) in time became a fund-raising event subsidising live arts. Rescued from this role by the intervention of the New Zealand Federation of Film Societies in 1984, the AIFF achieved an audience in excess of 100,000 for the first time in 2005. In 2019, it achieved a record audience of over 112,000. The year 2000 marked the AIFF's return to the refurbished Civic Theatre, a celebrated atmospheric theatre built in 1929.

Wellington
The Wellington Film Festival (WFF) was inaugurated by Lindsay Shelton and the Wellington Film Society with seven films in 1972. Thirty years later, it showed over 150 programmes to audiences in excess of 71,000. In 2018, it exceeded 84,000 admits. The main venue is the Embassy Theatre, and the WFF and NZIFF have played a major role in the theatre's rehabilitation and continuing refurbishment.

Dunedin and Christchurch 
Founded in 1977, the Dunedin manifestation of the Festival presented a highlights package of 75 features, plus short films, at the Regent Theatre. Founded along with the Dunedin event in 1977, the Christchurch Festival presented substantially the same programme.

Other regions
A selection of festival titles continue to travel around New Zealand, making the NZIFF unique on the world film-festival stage. Provincial centres covered by the festival include Gore, Hamilton, Hawke's Bay, Masterton, New Plymouth, Palmerston North, Tauranga and Timaru.

The New Zealand Film Festival Trust

Registered charity
The New Zealand Film Festival Trust, which runs the NZIFF, is a registered charitable entity under the Charities Act 2005, registration number CC23151.

Board members
The NZ Film Festival Trust is governed by a board of trustees. 

 Catherine Fitzgerald (Chair)
 Robin Laing 
 Tearepa Kahi
 Chris Hormann (appointed by the New Zealand Federation of Film Societies)
 Andrew Langridge
 James Every-Palmer

Staff
 In 2019 long-serving festival Director Bill Gosden retired after 40 years of service. "I look back with pride on the astounding array of national and international filmmaking that has found its first New Zealand audience at NZIFF. I leave with great confidence that whoever steps up next will be working with a remarkable and cohesive crew who love NZIFF and know it backwards.” said Gosden. New Director Marten Rabarts was appointed in October 2019. Gosden died on the seventh of November 2020.
 In early 2020 General Manager Sharon Byrne resigned from the festival after more than twenty years of service and Communications Manager Rebecca McMillan resigned after a decade with the organisation.
 In November 2021 Director Marten Rabarts stood down from the festival.

See also
List of film festivals in Oceania

References

External links
 
 Reel Big by Russell Baillie, New Zealand Herald, 13 June 2009

Film festivals in New Zealand
Film festivals established in 1970
Festivals in Auckland
Festivals in Christchurch
Festivals in Dunedin
Festivals in Wellington